Walter Andrade may refer to:

 Walter Andrade (footballer, born 1982), Peruvian defender
 Walter Andrade (footballer, born 1984), Argentine defender